Longerhouw is a small village in Súdwest-Fryslân municipality in the province of Friesland, the Netherlands. It had a population of around 50 in January 2017.

History
The village was first mentioned in the 13th century as Langherahof, and means long barnyard. Longerhouw is a terp (artificial living hill) village to the south of the former Marneslenk.

The Dutch Reformed church was renovated in 1757. On the inside there are wooden panels which depict the birth of Christ, crucifixion, ascent to heaven and last judgement in meticulous detail.

Longerhouw was home to 90 people in 1840. Before 2011, the village was part of the Wûnseradiel municipality.

Gallery

References

External links

Súdwest-Fryslân
Populated places in Friesland